Jamestown Regional Airport  is two miles northeast of Jamestown, in Stutsman County, North Dakota, United States. It is owned by the Jamestown Regional Airport Authority, and was formerly Jamestown Municipal Airport. It is used for general aviation and sees one airline, with flights twice each weekday and once on Saturdays and Sundays. Scheduled passenger service is subsidized by the Essential Air Service program.

Federal Aviation Administration records say the airport had 2,769 passenger boardings (enplanements) in calendar year 2008, 3,471 in 2009 and 4,434 in 2010. The National Plan of Integrated Airport Systems for 2011-2015 categorized it as a non-primary commercial service airport (between 2,500 and 10,000 enplanements per year).

Facilities
The airport covers 1,500 acres (607 ha) at an elevation of 1,500 feet (457 m). It has two asphalt runways: 13/31 is 6,502 by 100 feet (1,982 x 30 m) and 4/22 is 5,750 by 75 feet (1,753 x 23 m).

In 2010 the airport had 37,252 aircraft operations, average 102 per day: 85% general aviation, 11% air taxi, 4% airline and <1% military. 51 aircraft were then based at this airport: 96% single-engine, 2% multi-engine, and 2% helicopter.

Airline and destinations 

United Express uses CRJ200s operated by SkyWest Airlines to Denver and Devils Lake.

Historical airline service 
Northwest Airlines began flying to Jamestown in 1947; its first scheduled jets were in 1968.

Jamestown Aviation, Inc. began five day a week service on May 17, 1978, between Jamestown and Minneapolis, Minnesota with one daily round trip on a six-passenger twin-engine aircraft. This was in response to a Northwest pilot's strike that started on April 30, 1978, and the cancellation of Crystal Shamrock Airlines service on a route from Minneapolis, Fargo, Jamestown and Bismarck, North Dakota.

Statistics

References

Other sources 

 Essential Air Service documents (Docket DOT-OST-1997-2785) from the U.S. Department of Transportation:
 Order 2005-11-17 (November 22, 2005): selecting Mesaba Aviation, Inc., d/b/a Mesaba Airlines, to provide essential air service with Saab 340 aircraft at Devils Lake and Jamestown, North Dakota, for two years for annual subsidy rates of $1,329,858 at Devils Lake and $1,351,677 at Jamestown ($2,681,535 annually for both points combined).
 Order 2007-8-16 (August 17, 2007): re-selects Mesaba Aviation, Inc., d/b/a Mesaba Airlines, operating as Northwest AirLink, to provide essential air service with Saab 340 aircraft at Devils Lake and Jamestown, North Dakota, for the two-year period of October 1, 2007, through September 30, 2008, for annual subsidy rates of $1,331,664 at Devils Lake and $1,355,011 at Jamestown ($2,685,675 annually for both points combined).
 Order 2009-8-6 (August 11, 2009): re-selecting Mesaba Aviation, Inc., d/b/a Delta Connection, to provide Essential Air Service (EAS) with Saab 340 aircraft at Devils Lake and Jamestown, North Dakota, for the two-year period of October 1, 2009, through September 30, 2011, for annual subsidy rates of $1,459,493 at Devils Lake and $1,963,220 at Jamestown ($3,422,713 annually for both points combined).
 Ninety Day Notice (July 15, 2011): of Mesaba Aviation, Inc. and Pinnacle Airlines, Inc. of termination of service at Devils Lake, ND and Jamestown, ND.
 Order 2012-1-17 (January 23, 2012): selecting Great Lakes Aviation, Ltd. to provide Essential Air Service (EAS) at Jamestown, North Dakota, for an annual subsidy of $1,987,655, effective with the start of service by Great Lakes. We anticipate that Great Lakes will start service on or about March 12, 2012.
 Order 2014-1-19 (January 30, 2014): selecting SkyWest Airlines (SkyWest) to provide Essential Air Service (EAS) at Devils Lake, North Dakota, for $3,224,917 annually, and Jamestown, North Dakota, for $3,126,564 annually, with service set at eleven (11) nonstop or one-stop round trips per week at each community to Denver International Airport (DEN).

External links 
 Jamestown Regional Airport - Admiral Don Weiss Field, official website
 Jamestown Regional Airport at City of Jamestown website
 Jamestown Regional (JMS) page at North Dakota Aeronautics Commission website
 Aerial image as September 1997 from USGS The National Map
 

Airports in North Dakota
Buildings and structures in Jamestown, North Dakota
Transportation in Stutsman County, North Dakota
Essential Air Service